The 2009 AFL draft consisted of four opportunities for player acquisitions during the 2009/10 Australian Football League off-season. These were the trade week (held between 5 October and 9 October), the national draft (held on 26 November), the pre-season draft (15 December) and the rookie draft (15 December).

Player movements 
In the lead up to the trade week many high-profile players such as Brendan Fevola, Darren Jolly, Shaun Burgoyne, Luke Ball, Barry Hall, Andrew Lovett and Josh Gibson either requested to be traded or were suggested to be likely to be traded during the AFL's annual trading period. Of these players, only Luke Ball was unable to secure a trade by the end of the week.

Trade week was significantly more active than the previous year. Four trades involving seven players, including a three-team, four-player trade, were completed on the first day of the trade week alone, compared to only six players traded in the entire 2008 trade week. Overall, twenty-three players changed clubs (the most since the 2003 trade week), and twenty-five draft picks were traded. Of the sixteen active clubs, only the Adelaide Crows did not make a trade.

This was the first season in which teams were permitted to trade rookie-listed players, with Geelong's Shane Mumford being the first player to be traded whilst still officially on the rookie list.

Fevola trade
The most widely anticipated trade during trade week was that of Carlton full forward and incumbent Coleman medallist Brendan Fevola. Carlton announced its intentions to trade the 28-year-old Fevola after his drunken behaviour at the 2009 Brownlow Medal Count, which served as the last straw in a long rap sheet of off-field indiscretions while at the club.

The Brisbane Lions emerged as the likely destination. Brisbane initially offered 31-year-old full-forward Daniel Bradshaw and 23-year-old midfielder Michael Rischitelli in the trade. Both players were flown to Melbourne to tour Carlton's facilities, but Rischitelli was not willing to relocate. On the final day of trade week, Brisbane agreed to give Carlton 19-year-old key position prospect Lachlan Henderson and a first round draft pick, in exchange for Fevola, a second-round draft pick, and for Carlton to pay $100,000 of Fevola's salary for each of the two years remaining on his existing contract.

Although considered reasonable at the time, the trade is now widely viewed as a complete disaster for the Brisbane Lions, because all players involved in the trade negotiations had left the club within eighteen months. Shortly after trade, Bradshaw walked out on the Lions, and was recruited to the Sydney Swans in the pre-season draft – either because his feelings were hurt by being offered to trade, or because Fevola's recruitment would have limited Bradshaw's own opportunities in the Lions' forward-line. Rischitelli left the club at the end of 2010, after signing a contract with league newcomers Gold Coast; some in the media speculated that he was also disgruntled about being offered in the Fevola trade, but this has never been confirmed. Finally, prior to the 2011 season, Brisbane sacked Fevola after further off-field incidents during the 2010/11 offseason.

Trades

Source:AFL Trade Tracker
1. The numbering of the draft picks in this trades table is based on the original order prior to draft day. The final numbering of many of these draft picks was adjusted on draft day due to clubs passing in the later rounds.
2. Although lodged as a separate trade, this exchange of draft picks is effectively part of the three-team trade amongst Sydney, Brisbane and West Coast (trade No. 4).
3. Although lodged as a separate trade, this exchange of draft picks is effectively part of the four-team trade amongst Hawthorn, Essendon, Port Adelaide and Geelong (trade No. 14).

Retirements and delistings

2009 national draft 
The 2009 national draft was held on 26 November, a Thursday evening, rather than the Saturday morning timeslot that has been used in the past years. For the first time, the top ten selections will be made prior to the telecast, and unveiled in a countdown manner from ten to one, rather than the usual counting up method.

Melbourne finished the 2009 AFL season in last position and as they had won fewer than 5 games during each previous two seasons, they have the first two selections in the draft. This proved controversial as it was later revealed that the club had deliberately lost matches towards the end of the season; after a thorough investigation, the club was fined $500,000 in 2013. Despite much discussion concerning tanking during the season, no other club qualified for a priority pick.

In the lead up to the draft, it was widely tipped that Tom Scully and Jack Trengove would be Melbourne's first two selections. The destination of former St Kilda captain Luke Ball was also subject to much debate, with Collingwood being the likely club after failing to secure a trade for him during the October trade week.

2010 pre-season draft
The 2010 pre-season draft was held on Tuesday 15 December. Unlike the national draft, it is an online meeting using Microsoft Office Live Meeting software.

2010 rookie draft 
The 2010 rookie draft was held on Tuesday 15 December, immediately after the pre-season draft. Unlike the national draft, it is an online meeting using Microsoft Office Live Meeting software. The rookie draft rules allow each club to have up to eight rookies, and for the first time allowed clubs to retain rookies for a third year and be able to draft two mature-age rookies, without the restriction that they must not have been previously listed by an AFL club. The Gold Coast Football Club was allocated the first five selections, despite the new club only competing in the Victorian Football League for the 2010 season, before entering the AFL for the 2011 season.

Selections by league
National and pre-season draft selection totals by leagues:

References

Australian Football League draft
Draft
AFL draft
AFL draft